Sylvin Farms Winery is a winery in the Germania section of Galloway Township (mailing address is Egg Harbor City) in Atlantic County, New Jersey. The vineyard was first planted in 1977, and opened to the public in 1985. Sylvin Farms has 11 acres of grapes under cultivation, and produces 1,000 cases of wine per year. The winery’s name is an amalgamation of Sylvia and sylvan, reflecting the owner's wife's name and the surrounding Pine Barrens, respectively.

Wines
Sylvin Farms Winery was a pioneer in the growing of vinifera grapes in New Jersey, rather than French hybrid or native labrusca grapes. Sylvin Farms is located in the Outer Coastal Plain AVA, and produces wine from Barbera, Cabernet Franc, Cabernet Sauvignon, Chardonnay, Corvina, Dolcetto, Merlot, Muscat Ottonel, Nebbiolo, Pinot blanc, Pinot gris, Pinot noir, Riesling, Rkatsiteli, Sangiovese, Sauvignon blanc, Sémillon, Syrah, Tempranillo, Viognier, and Zinfandel grapes. It is the only winery in New Jersey that produces wine from Corvina and Pinot Blanc – Corvina is a red grape indigenous to the Veneto region of Italy, whereas Pinot blanc is a white grape native to the Alsace region of France.

Licensing and associations
Sylvin Farms has a farm winery license from the New Jersey Division of Alcoholic Beverage Control, which allows it to produce up to 50,000 gallons of wine per year, operate up to 15 off-premises sales rooms, and ship up to 12 cases per year to consumers in-state or out-of-state. The winery is a member of the Garden State Wine Growers Association and the Outer Coastal Plain Vineyard Association.

See also 
Alcohol laws of New Jersey
American wine
Judgment of Princeton
List of wineries, breweries, and distilleries in New Jersey
New Jersey Farm Winery Act
New Jersey Wine Industry Advisory Council
New Jersey wine

References

External links 
Garden State Wine Growers Association
Outer Coastal Plain Vineyard Association

1985 establishments in New Jersey
Galloway Township, New Jersey
Wineries in New Jersey
Tourist attractions in Atlantic County, New Jersey